(The Snow Queen) is a fairy-tale opera by George Alexander Albrecht to a libretto by Peter Truschner based on Andersen's "The Snow Queen". It premiered at the Nationaltheater Weimar in 2015. The vocal parts are scored for professional soloists and children's choir, with choir members acting.

History 
On an initiative by Gudrun Schröfel, the conductor of the Mädchenchor Hannover, George Alexander Albrecht composed his only opera as an opera for children, to be performed by soloists and a chorus of children who also have to act. At the time, he was already aged 78, and had worked mostly as an opera conductor. The libretto was written by Peter Truschner, who wrote a rhymed version of Andersen's "The Snow Queen".

The opera premiered at the Nationaltheater Weimar in 2015, conducted by  Dominik Beykirch, and directed by Maximilian von Mayenburg with set designs and costumes by Thilo Reuther. The premiere was prepared by a series of lectures at the Musikhochschule Weimar.

Roles 
Source:

Music 
The vocal parts are scored for professional soloists and children's choir, with choir members acting in roles such as flowers (Blumen), ravens (Raben), robbers (Räuber), snow flakes (Schneeflocken), wind and ice crystals. The music around the Snow Queen character is set atonal, contrasting with the human world. The children, Gerda and Kay, are characterised by song-like music, the troll declaims like Mime in Wagner's Siegfried, the Snow Queen sings in extremely high register, and scenes for ravens and robbers resemble operetta. The opera takes around 80 minutes to perform.

The score calls for an orchestra including flute, oboe, 2 clarinets, bassoon, 2 horns, trumpet, trombone, tuba, timpani, 2 drums, harp and strings.

Reception
Roland H. Dippel wrote in a review published in Leipziger Volkszeitung, Oper & Tanz and Neue Musikzeitung, that the opera deals with great emotions, proving oneself in dangers, and faith in the good. ("") He summarised: "A real opera with a large orchestra that fascinates its young audience for the art form" ("").

References

Further reading

External links
 

2015 operas
Operas
Children's operas
Operas based on fairy tales
German-language operas
Operas based on works by Hans Christian Andersen
Works based on The Snow Queen